CAP-e (cell-based antioxidant protection in erythrocytes), is a non-validated in vitro bioassay for antioxidant activity. The assay is performed by incubating red blood cells with a test sample at a range of concentrations. The cells are then combined with dichloro fluorescein diacetate (DCFDA), which is oxidized in the presence of free radicals to form a green fluorescent byproduct (DCF). Hydrogen peroxide is then added at to artificially induce severe oxidative stress. The antioxidant activity of varying concentrations of the test compound is measured based on the degree of inhibition of DCF-fluorescence, which is an indirect and nonspecific measure of reactive oxygen species production.

Cell-based antioxidant protection in erythrocytes is an important new development in the field of red blood cell research. This technology has the potential to improve the quality of life for patients with conditions that affect their red blood cells, such as sickle cell disease and malaria. Cell-based antioxidant protection in erythrocytes is an important new development in the field of red blood cell research. This technology has the potential to improve the quality of life for patients with conditions that affect their red blood cells, such as sickle cell disease and malaria.

References

Nutrition